Asperdaphne is a genus of sea snails, marine gastropod mollusks in the family Raphitomidae.

Description
This genus resembles Daphnella in form and general appearance, but differs in having the protoconch spirally grooved instead of being obliquely reticulated. The contour is lanceolate rather than oval. The shell has usually more whorls, increasing less rapidly, with a longer and more turreted spire. The anal fasciole is usually more marked than in Daphnella, being more excavate, and crossed by sharp crescentic riblets. Some members of this genus have a superficial resemblance to Defrancia, under which genus they have been arranged.

Distribution
This marine genus occurs in the Western Pacific, from Japan to New Zealand; also off Australia (New South Wales, Queensland, South Australia, Tasmania, Victoria).

Species
Species within the genus Asperdaphne include:
 Asperdaphne albovirgulata (Souverbie, 1860)
 Asperdaphne bastowi (Gatliff & Gabriel, 1908)
 Asperdaphne bela Hedley, 1922
 Asperdaphne bitorquata (Sowerby III, 1896)
 Asperdaphne desalesii (Tenison-Woods, 1877)
 Asperdaphne elegantissima (Schepman, 1913)
 Asperdaphne esperanza (May, 1911)
 Asperdaphne laceyi (Sowerby III, 1889)
 Asperdaphne legrandi (Beddome, 1883)
 Asperdaphne moretonica (Smith E. A., 1882)
 Asperdaphne paramoretonica B.-Q. Li & X.-Z. Li, 2014
 Asperdaphne peradmirabilis (Smith E. A., 1879)
 Asperdaphne perissa (Hedley, 1909)
 Asperdaphne perplexa (Verco, 1909)
 Asperdaphne plutonos Thiele, 1925
 †  Asperdaphne recticostulata Yokoyama, 1922
 Asperdaphne sculptilis (Angas, 1871)
 Asperdaphne subzonata (Smith E. A., 1879)
 Asperdaphne suluensis (Schepman, 1913)
 Asperdaphne tasmanica (Tenison-Woods, 1877)
 Asperdaphne trimaculata Cotton, 1947
 Asperdaphne ula (Watson, 1881)
 Asperdaphne versivestita (Hedley, 1912)
 Asperdaphne vestalis (Hedley, 1903)
 Asperdaphne walcotae (Sowerby III, 1893)
Species brought into synonymy 
 Asperdaphne aculeata (Webster, 1906): synonym of Pleurotomella aculeata (Webster, 1906)
 Asperdaphne albocincta G.F. Angas, 1871synonym of Apispiralia albocincta  (G.F. Angas, 1871)
 Asperdaphne amplecta Hedley, 1922: synonym of Pleurotomella amplecta (Hedley, 1922)
 Asperdaphne angasi Hedley, 1903: synonym of Asperdaphne sculptilis (Angas, 1871)
 Asperdaphne balcombensis Powell 1944 †: synonym of Pleurotomella balcombensis (Powell, 1944) †
 Asperdaphne brenchleyi (Angas, 1877): synonym of Pleurotomella brenchleyi (Angas, 1877)
 Asperdaphne capricornea Hedley, 1922: synonym of Pleurotomella capricornea (Hedley, 1922)
 Asperdaphne compacta Hedley, 1922: synonym of Pleurotomella compacta (Hedley, 1922)
 Asperdaphne contigua Powell, 1944 †: synonym of Pleurotomella contigua (Powell, 1944) †
 Asperdaphne expeditionis Dell, 1956: synonym of Pleurotomella expeditionis (Dell, 1956)
 Asperdaphne hayesiana (Angas, 1871): synonym of Pleurotomella hayesiana (Angas, 1871)
 Asperdaphne rothauseni Gürs, 1998 †: synonym of Pleurotomella rothauseni (Gürs, 1998) †
 Asperdaphne rugosa Laseron, 1954: synonym of Pleurotomella rugosa (Laseron, 1954)
 Asperdaphne sculptilior Tenison-Woods, 1879: synonym of Asperdaphne desalesii (Tenison-Woods, 1877)
 Asperdaphne sexdentata Pritchard & Gatliff, 1899: synonym of Asperdaphne desalesii (Tenison-Woods, 1877)
 Asperdaphne sepulta Laseron, 1954: synonym of Pleurotomella sepulta (Laseron, 1954)
 Asperdaphne tasmanica May, 1916: synonym of Asperdaphne bela Hedley, 1922
 Asperdaphne vercoi (G. B. Sowerby III, 1896): synonym of Pleurotomella vercoi (G.B. Sowerby III, 1896)

References

 Powell, A.W.B. 1966. The molluscan families Speightiidae and Turridae, an evaluation of the valid taxa, both Recent and fossil, with list of characteristic species. Bulletin of the Auckland Institute and Museum. Auckland, New Zealand 5: 1–184, pls 1–23 
 Wilson, B. 1994. Australian marine shells. Prosobranch gastropods. Kallaroo, WA : Odyssey Publishing Vol. 2 370 pp.

External links
 Hedley C. (1918). A checklist of the marine fauna of New South Wales. Part 1. Journal and Proceedings of the Royal Society of New South Wales. 51: M1-M120
 Hedley C. (1922). A revision of the Australian Turridae. Records of the Australian Museum. 13(6): 213-359
 Powell, Arthur William Baden. "The Australian Tertiary Mollusca of the Family Turridae." Records of the Auckland Institute and Museum 3.1 (1944): p. 59:  Asperdaphne balcombens, Powell, 1944
  Bouchet, P.; Kantor, Y. I.; Sysoev, A.; Puillandre, N. (2011). A new operational classification of the Conoidea (Gastropoda). Journal of Molluscan Studies. 77(3): 273-308
 Worldwide Mollusc Species Data Base: Raphitomidae
 

 
Raphitomidae
Gastropod genera